The Hospitality Awarding Body (HAB) was, until January 2010, the United Kingdom's specialist awarding body for hospitality and catering qualifications.

History
In 2005 the company was acquired by the City and Guilds of London Institute, retaining its independent awarding body status until August 2009.

In January 2010 all active HAB candidates registered since 1 September 2006 were transferred onto City & Guilds awards.

See also
Confederation of Tourism and Hospitality

External links
 City & Guilds website
 * American Hotel & Lodging Educational Institute

Hospitality industry in the United Kingdom
Hospitality industry organizations
Vocational education in the United Kingdom